Elvis Mešić (born 12 September 1981 in Bosanska Krupa, Bosnia and Herzegovina) is a Bosnian-Herzegovinian retired footballer who played as a defender.

Club career
He started his career in a NK Bratstvo from his hometown. Good games for the club were a good recommendation for a transfer in Premier league side NK Jedinstvo Bihać. He later played for Croatian Prva HNL club HNK Cibalia and FK Željezničar for two seasons, respectively. In summer of 2011, he moved to Hapoel Ironi Rishon LeZion F.C. in the Israeli Premier League.

References

1981 births
Living people
People from Bosanska Krupa
Bosniaks of Bosnia and Herzegovina
Association football defenders
Bosnia and Herzegovina footballers
NK Jedinstvo Bihać players
HNK Cibalia players
FK Željezničar Sarajevo players
Hapoel Rishon LeZion F.C. players
FK Krajina Cazin players
FK Sloboda Novi Grad players
Premier League of Bosnia and Herzegovina players
Croatian Football League players
Israeli Premier League players
First League of the Federation of Bosnia and Herzegovina players
First League of the Republika Srpska players
Bosnia and Herzegovina expatriate footballers
Expatriate footballers in Croatia
Bosnia and Herzegovina expatriate sportspeople in Croatia
Expatriate footballers in Israel
Bosnia and Herzegovina expatriate sportspeople in Israel